Ted E. Wedemeyer Jr. (August 30, 1932July 23, 2008) was an American lawyer and a judge of the Wisconsin Court of Appeals.  Wedemeyer served twice on the court's Milwaukee-based District I; he was the district's presiding judge from 1983 to 1985 and from 1992 until 2007.

Early life and career
Wedemeyer was born in Milwaukee, Wisconsin. His father, Ted Sr., was an attorney and politician who served as a Milwaukee alderman, as a civil court judge, and as a Milwaukee County supervisor. Wedemeyer Jr. graduated from Marquette University Law School and worked as a private practice attorney in Milwaukee from 1957 to 1974. Wedemeyer was active in Democratic politics; he served on the executive board of the Milwaukee County Democratic Party and chaired Milwaukee Mayor Henry Maier's campaign committee. In the early 1970s, Wedemeyer was appointed by Maier to chair the Milwaukee Board of Zoning Appeals.

Judicial career
In 1974, Wedemeyer assisted in the development and organization of the Milwaukee Municipal Court, a limited-jurisdiction court hearing city ordinance violations. In November 1974, Maier appointed Wedemeyer as one of the court's first two judges. He served as a municipal judge until 1977, when he was appointed to the Milwaukee County Circuit Court by Acting Governor Marty Schreiber. In 1982, he challenged Wisconsin Court of Appeals Judge Rudolph T. Randa for his seat on the court's Milwaukee-based District I. Wedemeyer unseated Randa in the April general election; from 1983 to 1985, he served as District I's presiding judge.

In the leadup to the 1988 Milwaukee mayoral election, Wedemeyer was suggested as a possible successor to the retiring Maier, but ultimately did not run. Instead, he was challenged for reelection to the Court of Appeals by Milwaukee County Circuit Judge Ralph Adam Fine, who touted his opposition to plea bargaining and defeated Wedemeyer after a contentious campaign. Governor Tommy Thompson, a Republican, appointed Wedemeyer to replace Fine on the circuit court.

In 1992, Wedemeyer was returned to the Court of Appeals; he was elected without opposition to a newly created seat in District I.  He became the district's presiding judge in the same year, occupying that office until 2007. He sought election to the Wisconsin Supreme Court in 1995 and received support from the Milwaukee press, but failed to survive the February primary election.

Wedemeyer was noted for his involvement in community service activities.  Active in promoting soccer in Wisconsin through the Milwaukee Kickers organization, he was inducted into the Wisconsin Soccer Association Hall of Fame in 1992.

Death
Wedemeyer died of lung cancer, while still in office, on July 23, 2008.

Electoral history

Wisconsin Circuit Court (1978)

| colspan="6" style="text-align:center;background-color: #e9e9e9;"| General Election, April 4, 1978

Wisconsin Court of Appeals (1982, 1988, 1992)

| colspan="6" style="text-align:center;background-color: #e9e9e9;"| General Election, April 6, 1982

| colspan="6" style="text-align:center;background-color: #e9e9e9;"| General Election, April 5, 1988

| colspan="6" style="text-align:center;background-color: #e9e9e9;"| General Election, April 7, 1992

Wisconsin Supreme Court (1995)

| colspan="6" style="text-align:center;background-color: #e9e9e9;"| Primary Election, February 21, 1995

| colspan="6" style="text-align:center;background-color: #e9e9e9;"| General Election, April 4, 1995

Wisconsin Court of Appeals (1997, 2003)

| colspan="6" style="text-align:center;background-color: #e9e9e9;"| General Election, April 1, 1997

| colspan="6" style="text-align:center;background-color: #e9e9e9;"| General Election, April 1, 2003

References

1932 births
2008 deaths
Deaths from cancer in Wisconsin
Deaths from lung cancer
Politicians from Milwaukee
Wisconsin Court of Appeals judges
Wisconsin lawyers
Wisconsin Democrats
Military personnel from Milwaukee
United States Air Force airmen
Marquette University Law School alumni
20th-century American judges
Lawyers from Milwaukee
21st-century American judges
20th-century American lawyers